Matyldzin may refer to the following places in Poland:

Matyldzin, Kuyavian-Pomeranian Voivodeship
Matyldzin, Masovian Voivodeship